The Ollivier law (Loi Ollivier) was a French law, voted in 25 May 1864, which legalized the right to strike which was not allowed in France since 1791. However it remained limited and still maintained the concept of "impeding the free exercise of employees rights" ("délit d'entrave à la liberté du travail").

Also the Trade unions were still not allowed. They were allowed only since the Waldeck-Rousseau law on 21 March 1884.

References

French labour law